Sant'Agata di Esaro is a town and comune in the province of Cosenza, in the Calabria region of southern Italy.

Twin towns
 Seregno, Italy

References

Cities and towns in Calabria